Tuamarina River is a river in Marlborough in the South Island of New Zealand. It flows into the Wairau River just south of Tuamarina.

Notes

Rivers of the Marlborough Region
Rivers of New Zealand